The 1969 Tasman Series was a motor racing competition staged in New Zealand and Australia for cars complying with the Tasman Formula. The series, which commenced on 4 January 1969 and ended on 16 February 1969 after seven rounds, was the sixth annual Tasman Series. It was won by Chris Amon, driving a Dino 246 Tasmania.

Races

The series was contested over seven races.

Points system 
Series points were awarded at each race on the following basis.

All points scored by each driver were retained to determine final series placings.

Series standings

References

1969
Tasman Series
Tasman Series